Senior Cup may refer to one of the following sporting competitions:

Cricket
Irish Senior Cup (cricket)
Leinster Senior League Cup (cricket)
North West Senior Cup (cricket)

Field hockey
Leinster Schoolgirls' Senior Cup (field hockey)
Men's Irish Senior Cup (field hockey)
Ulster Schoolgirls' Senior Cup (field hockey)
Women's Irish Senior Cup (field hockey)

Football (soccer)

Amateur Football Alliance Senior Cup
Bedfordshire Senior Cup
Berks & Bucks Senior Cup
Carmarthenshire Senior Cup
Connacht Senior Cup (association football)
Cumberland Senior Cup
Devon Senior Cup
East Riding Senior Cup
Gloucestershire Senior Cup
Herefordshire Senior Cup
Huntingdonshire Senior Cup
Isle of Wight Senior Cup
Kent Senior Cup
Leicestershire and Rutland Senior Cup
Leinster Senior Cup (association football)
Lincolnshire Senior Cup
Middlesex Senior Cup
Middlesex Senior Charity Cup
Munster Senior Cup (association football)
Norfolk Senior Cup
North West Senior Cup (football)
Northamptonshire Senior Cup
Pembrokeshire Senior Cup
Peterborough Senior Cup
Staffordshire Senior Cup
Surrey Senior Cup
West Wales FA Senior Cup
Wiltshire County FA Senior Cup
Worcestershire Senior Cup

Rugby

Connacht Schools Rugby Senior Cup
Connacht Senior Cup (rugby union)
Devon RFU Senior Cup
Durham County RFU Senior Cup
Leinster Schools Rugby Senior Cup
Leinster Senior Cup (rugby union)
Middlesex RFU Senior Cup
Munster Schools Rugby Senior Cup
Munster Senior Cup (rugby union)
North Gloucestershire Combination Senior Cup
Northumberland Senior Cup (rugby union)
Somerset Senior Cup
Staffordshire Senior Cup (rugby union)
Stroud and District Combination Senior Cup

See also
CECAFA Cup, also known as the CECAFA Senior Challenge Cup
COSAFA Cup, also known as the COSAFA Senior Challenge Cup
Senior Bowl (disambiguation)